The Gahcho Kué kimberlite pipes is a cluster of Cambrian kimberlite diatremes located  northeast of Yellowknife, Northwest Territories, Canada. It consists of five pipes: 5034, Hearne, Wilson, Tuzo and Tesla.

See also
Volcanism of Canada
Volcanism of Northern Canada
List of volcanoes in Canada
Gahcho Kue Diamond Mine Project

References

Diatremes of the Northwest Territories
Cambrian volcanoes